The Schwedenschanze in Dörscheid in the Middle Rhine valley is a Sternschanze or star-shaped fortification that was probably built when the Landgrave of Hesse was besieged by the Palatine Kaub in 1631/32 during the Thirty Years' War.

The schanze lie 750 metres west of the village of Dörscheid on an eminence. It is no longer recognisable as a Sternschanze because it has been heavily slighted. Only at the southwestern tip is the bank up to about 2 metres high. There was once a ditch about five metres wide that is no longer visible.

Protected monument 
The site of the schanze is a protected ground monument (Bodendenkmal) under Rhineland-Palatinate law. Permission must be sought for excavations and targeted collection of artefacts; incidental finds must be reported to the authorities.

Literature 
 Karl August von Cohausen: Landwehren und alte Schanzen des Regierungsbezirks Wiesbaden in the  Nassau Annals (Nassauische Annalen), Vol. 15 (1879).

Hill forts in Germany
Castles in Rhineland-Palatinate
Rhein-Lahn-Kreis